Agnieszka Radwańska was the defending champion, but lost 6–0, 6–3 in the semifinals to the eventual champion Serena Williams.

Williams went on to win the tournament for the record sixth time, defeating five-time finalist Maria Sharapova 4–6, 6–3, 6–0 in the final.

Seeds
All seeds receive a bye into the second round.

Draw

Finals

Top half

Section 1

Section 2

Section 3

Section 4

Bottom half

Section 5

Section 6

Section 7

Section 8

Qualifying

Seeds

Qualifiers

Lucky losers
  Lauren Davis

Draw

First qualifier

Second qualifier

Third qualifier

Fourth qualifier

Fifth qualifier

Sixth qualifier

Seventh qualifier

Eighth qualifier

Ninth qualifier

Tenth qualifier

Eleventh qualifier

Twelfth qualifier

External links
 WTA tournament draws
 ITF tournament draws

Women's singles
Sony Open Tennis - Women's Singles
Women in Florida